The 2000 Pan American Men's Handball Championship was the ninth edition of the tournament, held in São Bernardo do Campo, Brazil from 23 to 28 May 2000. It acted as the American qualifying tournament for the 2001 World Championship, where the top four placed teams qualified.

Preliminary round
All times are local (UTC−3).

Group A

Group B

Knockout stage

Bracket

Fifth place bracket

5–8th place semifinals

Semifinals

Seventh place game

Fifth place game

Third place game

Final

Final ranking

Argentina, Cuba, Brazil and United states are qualified for 2001 World Championship. Cuba finally withdrew and was replaced by Greenland.

All-star team

External links
Results on todor66.com

Pan American Men's Handball Championship
2000 in handball
2000 in Brazilian sport
International handball competitions hosted by Brazil
May 2000 sports events in South America